Project 11780 Kherson was a 1980s-era Soviet LHD program derived from the  design comparable to the US . The ship would have been about 25,000 tons displacement, with steam turbine power plants and carried about 12 helicopters and four Ondatra-class landing craft or two Tsaplya-class LCACs. It was cancelled with the fall of the Soviet Union in 1991.

See also  
Tarawa class amphibious assault ship
List of ships of the Soviet Navy
List of ships of Russia by project number

References

External links
http://www.globalsecurity.org/military/world/russia/ship-soviet-2.htm
https://www.navalnews.com/naval-news/2019/12/russia-to-begin-construction-of-lhd-in-2020-part-1/

Helicopter carrier classes
Amphibious warfare vessel classes
Cold War aircraft carriers of the Soviet Union
Amphibious warfare vessels of the Soviet Union
Proposed aircraft carriers
Abandoned military projects of the Soviet Union